The Great Adventure can refer to:

Albums
The Great Adventure (Steven Curtis Chapman album), 1992
The Great Adventure (The Neal Morse Band album), 2019

Film and theatre
The Great Adventure (play), "A Play of Fancy in Four Acts", 1913 play by the English author Arnold Bennett
The Great Adventure (1915 film), British silent comedy based on Arnold Bennett's work, directed by Laurence Trimble#Select filmography
The Great Adventure (1918 film), American silent comedy-drama
The Great Adventure (1921 film), American silent comedy based on Arnold Bennett's work
The Great Adventure (1951 film), British-South African action adventure a/k/a The Adventurers, Fortune in Diamonds or South African Story
The Great Adventure (1952 film), Czechoslovak biographical adventure; original title Velké dobrodruzství, with Vladimír Brabec#Selected filmography
The Great Adventure (1953 film), Swedish drama
The Great Adventure (1974 film), Argentine action comedy
The Great Adventure (1975 film), Italian adventure starring Jack Palance#Filmography
The Great Adventure (2003 film), Canadian-French ecological documentary

Television
The Great Adventure, 24 May 1939 BBC live adaptation of Arnold Bennett's work with Finlay Currie#Complete filmography as Texel
The Great Adventure, 11 December 1947 BBC live adaptation of Arnold Bennett's work with Finlay Currie#Complete filmography as Texel
The Great Adventure, 18 January 1956 The United States Steel Hour#Television live adaptation of Arnold Bennett's work
The Great Adventure, 17 January 1957 ITV Play of the Week live adaptation of Arnold Bennett's work
The Great Adventure, 25 May 1958 BBC Sunday-Night Theatre live adaptation of Arnold Bennett's work
The Great Adventure (U.S. TV series), 1963–64 American history anthology series
"The Great Adventure", 27 October 1985 episode of Australian miniseries Anzacs (TV series)#Episodes
"The Great Adventure", 8 December 1987 episode of British animated children's series, Henry's Cat#Series 4 (1986–1987)
The Great Adventure (HK TV series), 2005 Hong Kong drama series

See also
Great Adventure, American amusement park in New Jersey, a/k/a Six Flags Great Adventure
The Great Adventuress, 1928 German silent comedy film, original title Die große Abenteuerin